Lockout may refer to:

 Lockout (industry), a type of work stoppage
Dublin Lockout,  a major industrial dispute between approximately 20,000 workers and 300 employers 1913 - 1914
 Lockout (sports), lockout in sports leagues
MLB lockout, lockout in MLB
NBA lockout, lockout in NBA
NFL lockout, lockout in NFL
NHL lockout, lockout in NHL
 Lockout (film), a 2012 science fiction action film
 Lock Out (film), a 1973 Spanish film
 Lockout chip, a computer chip in a video game system to prevent use of unauthorized software
 Lock-out device, part of a signaling system used on game shows
 Regional lockout, a barrier to prevent media use outside of a specific region
 Lockout (news filing), a kind of "dateline" appended to a news report
 Lockout–tagout, a procedure to prevent unsafe activation of machinery
 A period in some hostels during which guests are disallowed from the premises